Henri I de Bourbon, Prince of Condé (29 December 1552 – 5 March 1588) was a French prince du sang and Huguenot general like his more prominent father, Louis I, Prince of Condé.

Life
Henri was the eldest son of Louis I de Bourbon and Eléanor de Roye, daughter and heiress of Charles de Roye, Count of Roucy. Of the eight children in his family, he and his brother François, Prince of Conti, were the only ones to have children.

Following the death of his father, Louis, at the Battle of Jarnac, Jeanne d'Albret introduced Henri and her own son, Henry of Navarre, as pages to Admiral Coligny. Since both were princes of the blood, this act gave the Huguenot cause legitimacy.

At the Battle of Moncontour on 3 October 1569, Henri was wounded in the face and was forced to retreat. Attending the wedding of Henry of Navarre and the subsequent massacre of Protestants, Henri was forced to convert to Catholicism, face death or life imprisonment. In his escape from Paris, Henri was joined by Theodore Beza, who published his Du droit des magistrats sur leurs sujets in Germany.

By 1573 the Huguenot cause had made some political gains in the Midi, consequently Henri was assigned "governor general and protector". Following the Peace of Monsieur, he was restored to his governorship of Picardy. During the sixth war of religion, he commanded the forces that captured Brouage and allowed for English aid for the Huguenots. And, it would be Henri, angered by Catholic resistance to his governorship of Picardy, who started the seventh war of religion by seizing the town of La Fère in November 1579.

In 1588, Henri died at Saint-Jean-d'Angély after a brief illness.

Marriages
He married twice, first to his cousin, Marie of Cleves. With Marie, Henri had one child:

 Catherine (1574–1595), Marquise d'Isles

Secondly, Henri married his second cousin once removed, Charlotte Catherine de La Tremoille (1568–1629), daughter of Louis III de La Trémoille. They had at least two children:

 Éléonore de Bourbon (1587–1619), married in 1606 to Philip William, Prince of Orange.
 Henri II, Prince of Condé (1588–1646)

References

Sources

1552 births
1588 deaths
People from La Ferté-sous-Jouarre
House of Bourbon-Condé
Huguenots
French people of the French Wars of Religion
Princes of Condé
16th-century peers of France